SantaMental is the fourth and the holiday studio album from Steve Lukather, released in 2003.

History
When Lukather's record company, Bop City Records, approached him about recording a Christmas album, he quipped, "Why me? Do I look like Father Christmas to you mofos?" The company wanted him to do the record knowing he would approach the project with a unique angle and produce something different from the typical Christmas album.  Lukather recruited keyboardist Jeff Babko and guitarist Larry Carlton, who Lukather had worked with previously, to help arrange the songs.  The result was a challenge to Lukather, who had to be creative to turn the traditionally simple songs into something interesting for listeners.

The musicians Lukather chose for SantaMental, most of whom are hard rock veterans, lent a heavy feel to the album.  Van Halen recorded guitar tracks for "Joy to the World" after not having been in the studio for some time but immediately made an impression on Lukather with his level of playing.  Vai provided guitar work for "Carol of the Bells" along with Lukather's son Trevor, then 14 years old. Slash, who recorded his part in one take, played on the Lukather/Stan Lynch composition "Broken Heart for Christmas."  Lukather spoke highly of Slash after the project, calling him the "Keith Richards of our generation."  Famous session guitarist Michael Landau played on the song "Look Out For Angels," and there is a previously unreleased version of "Jingle Bells" sung by Sammy Davis Jr.

Track listing
All songs traditional arranged by Steve Lukather and Jeff Babko, except where noted.

"Joy to the World" - 3:07
"Greensleeves" - 6:58
"Jingle Bells" - 2:19
"Carol of the Bells" - 4:42
"Broken Heart for Christmas" (Lukather, Stan Lynch)- 4:09
"Angels We Have Heard on High" - 4:55
"Winter Wonderland" - 4:05
"Look Out for Angels" (Lukather, Babko) - 5:19
"Silent Night" - 4:33
"Goodbye" - 0:47 (Virtual track, not on the record.)
"The Christmas Song" (Traditional; Arranged by Lukather and Larry Carlton) - 2:16

Personnel 
 Steve Lukather – guitar (1, 2, 4-10), lead guitar (3), lead vocals (3–5, 7, 8), backing vocals (3)
 Jeff Babko – keyboards (1, 5, 6, 8, 9), synthesizers (2, 4), trombone (3, 7), backing vocals (3), horn arrangements and conductor (3, 7), guitar (4), lead vocals (4), organ (7)
 Eddie Van Halen – guitar (1)
 Trevor Lukather – guitar (4)
 Steve Vai – guitar (4)
 Slash – guitar (5)
 Michael Landau – guitar (8)
 John Pierce – bass (1-9)
 Gregg Bissonette – drums (1-9), trumpet (3)
 Simon Phillips – tambourine (1)
 Lenny Castro – percussion (2, 5-8), bell tree (3), backing vocals (3)
 Edgar Winter – saxophone (2, 7), lead vocals (7)
 George Shelby – saxophone (3, 7)
 Walt Fowler – trumpet (3, 7)
 Sammy Davis Jr. – lead vocals (3)
 Scott Hamilton – backing vocals (3)

In a 2021 interview with CJRT-FM's Brad Barker, Babko identified figure skater Scott Hamilton as a backing vocalist rather than Scott Hamilton the musician, stating that "he was a fan of Lukather's."

Production 
 Steve Lukather – producer 
 Elliot Scheiner – producer, recording, mixing 
 Steve Saxton – executive producer 
 Gina Zangla – art direction, design 
 Robert Knight – cover photography

References

External links
Album information

Steve Lukather albums
2003 Christmas albums
Christmas albums by American artists
Rock Christmas albums